Breede WMA, or Breede Water Management Area (coded: 18), Includes the following major rivers: the Breede River, Riviersonderend River, Sout River, Bot River and Palmiet River, and covers the following Dams:

 Brandvlei Dam Lower Brandvlei River 
 Buffeljags Dam Buffeljags River 
 Eikenhof Dam Palmiet River 
 Elandskloof Dam Elands River 
 Keerom Dam Nuy River 
 Klipberg Dam Konings River 
 Kwaggaskloof Dam Doorn River 
 Lakenvallei Dam Sanddrifskloof River 
 Pietersfontein Dam Pietersfontein River 
 Poortjieskloof Dam Groot River 
 Roode Els Berg Dam Sanddrifskloof River 
 Stettynskloof Dam Holsloot River 
 Teewaterskloof Dam Sonderend River

Boundaries 
Tertiary drainage regions G40 (excluding quaternary catchment G40A), G50, and H10 to H70.

See also 
 Water Management Areas
 List of reservoirs and dams in South Africa
 List of rivers of South Africa

References 
 

Water Management Areas
Dams in South Africa